Central Gymkhana Ground is a multi purpose stadium in Bhopal, Madhya Pradesh, India. The ground is mainly used for organizing matches of football, cricket and other sports.

The stadium hosted four first-class matches  from 1961 when Madhya Pradesh cricket team played against Pakistan cricket team in a tour match. until 1965. Since then the ground has hosted non-first-class matches.

References

External links
Cricinfo profile
Cricketarchive.com

Sports venues in Madhya Pradesh
Sports venues in Indore
Sport in Indore
Cricket grounds in Madhya Pradesh
Multi-purpose stadiums in India
Sport in Madhya Pradesh
Sports venues completed in 1960
1960 establishments in Madhya Pradesh
20th-century architecture in India